Peter Alan Rickmann is the current Anglican Dean of Waikato: as such he is responsible for maintaining the fabric of the building, welcoming visitors to this historic building and organising the worship for this, one of the two cathedrals within the Diocese of Waikato. As such he is a crucial member of its senior leadership team.

He was born in 1968 and educated at Ripon College Cuddesdon. He was ordained in 1998 and began his career with a curacy at Bitterne Park.He was Chaplain at St Paul's Collegiate School in Hamilton, New Zealand from 2001 to 2004 and Priest in charge of Bransgore with Hinton Admiral from 2004 to 2012, during which time he was also a Sub-Chaplain of HMP Winchester.

References

.

1968 births
Alumni of Ripon College Cuddesdon
Deans of Waikato
Living people